Greek National Road 4a (Greek: Εθνική Οδός 4a, abbreviated as EO4a) is a dual carriageway road in northern Greece. It connects Veria with Skydra, passing through Naoussa.

4a
Roads in Central Macedonia